Fan Haifu (15 August 1933 – 8 July 2022) was a Chinese crystallographer, physicist, and writer. He was a member of the Chinese Academy of Sciences and The World Academy of Sciences.

Biography
Fan was born and raised in Guangzhou, Guangdong, during the Republic of China. He secondary studied at Guangdong Experimental High School. He graduated from Peking University in 1956, where he majored in chemistry. He studied chemistry and physics under Tang Youqi, Fu Ying, Xu Guangxian, Zhou Guangzhao, Chen Shaoli, and Wu Qianzhang. After graduation, he applied for an internship in the Institute of Physics of the Chinese Academy of Sciences, and became a professor at University of Science and Technology of China and Sun Yat-sen University.

He was elected a fellow of the Chinese Academy of Sciences in 1991 and a fellow of the World Academy of Sciences in 2000. He is also a recipient of the 1996 TWAS Prize.

Personal life
Fan married Li Fanghua, she was also a Chinese physicist.

Book
 Physical and Non-Physical Methods of Solving Crystal Structures  (collaboration with Michael Woolfson)

Awards
The Second Class Prize of Natural Sciences of China (1987)
The TWAS award in physics (1996)
The Tan Kah Kee Science Award in mathematics and physics (2006)

References

1933 births
2022 deaths
Crystallographers
Educators from Guangdong
Members of the Chinese Academy of Sciences
Peking University alumni
People's Republic of China science writers
Physicists from Guangdong
TWAS fellows
TWAS laureates
Writers from Guangzhou